West Rutland is a town in Rutland County, Vermont, United States. The population was 2,214 at the 2020 census. The town center, located in the south-central portion of the town and where about 87% of the population resides, is defined by the U.S. Census Bureau as a census-designated place (CDP). The town is part of the Rutland micropolitan NECTA.

Local culture
West Rutland has many small businesses, many of which are found on Marble Street, the town's main street. Other businesses include Boardman Hill Farm (including its associated solar farm) and the Carving Studio & Sculpture Center.
 
The town has a small public school, West Rutland School, that enrolls students from pre-kindergarten to 12th grade. It is part of the Quarry Valley Unified Union School District.

History

The town of Rutland was originally granted in 1761 as one of the New Hampshire Grants and named after Rutland, Massachusetts, the home of the first grantee, John Murrey. It was one of the most successful of those grants because of excellent farmland and gentle topography.

In 1863, there was rioting in West Rutland after the state instituted a draft.

During a strike in 1868, owners evicted Irish-Catholic workers from company-owned homes, then imported dozens of French-Canadian Catholic "strikebreakers" to replace them.

West Rutland petitioned the Vermont legislature to separate from East Rutland. On November 19, 1886, West Rutland was incorporated as its own town.

The Marble Street Historic District was added to the National Register of Historic Places in 1990.

Marble industry 

In the early 19th century, small high-quality marble deposits were discovered in Rutland, and in the 1830s a large deposit of nearly solid marble of high quality was found in what is now West Rutland. By the 1840s small firms had begun operations, but marble quarries only became profitable when the railroad arrived in 1851. At the same time, the famous quarries of Carrara in Tuscany, Italy, became largely unworkable because of their extreme depth, and Rutland quickly became one of the leading producers of marble in the world.

This fueled enough growth and investment that in 1886 the marble companies saw to it that when the present Rutland City was incorporated, most of the remainder of the village was split off as West Rutland and Proctor. Although the closing of the marble quarries in the area in the 1980s and 1990s cost the town many jobs, West Rutland has attracted artists and families looking for a semi-rural lifestyle. Because it is a very rural town, much of its economy is dependent on the city of Rutland.

Demographics

At the 2010 census, there were 2,326 people, 1,691 households, and 1166 families in the town. The population density was 72.0 people per square mile (54.7/km2).  There were 1,079 housing units at an average density of 60.38/sq mi (23.31/km2).  The racial makeup of the town was 96.9%% White, 0.5% African American, 0.4% Native American, 1.7% Asian, 0.04% are Pacific Islander, 0.04% from other races, and 0.8% from two or more races.  0.7% of the population were Hispanic or Latino of any race.

Of the 1,021 households 30.1% had children under the age of 18 living with them, 52.8% were married couples living together, 10.1% had a female householder with no husband present, and 32.8% were non-families. 25.9% of households were one person and 12.7% were one person aged 65 or older.  The average household size was 2.48 and the average family size was 3.00.

The age distribution was 23.8% under the age of 18, 6.6% from 18 to 24, 29.8% from 25 to 44, 24.7% from 45 to 64, and 15.1% 65 or older.  The median age was 39.0 years. For every 100 females, there were 96.1 males.  For every 100 females age 18 and over, there were 95.0 males.

The median household income was $67,389 and the median family income  was $71,955. Males had a median income of $30,962 versus $21,935 for females. The per capita income for the town was $17,325.  14.7% of the population and 11.2% of families were below the poverty line.  Out of the total people living in poverty, 60.8% are under the age of 18 and 9.2% are 65 or older.

Of the 913 households 29.7% had children under the age of 18 living with them, 51.2% were married couples living together, 10.4% had a female householder with no husband present, and 34.2% were non-families. 27.2% of households were one person and 13.3% were one person aged 65 or older.  The average household size was 2.48 and the average family size was 3.03.

The age distribution was 24.0% under the age of 18, 7.1% from 18 to 24, 29.7% from 25 to 44, 24.6% from 45 to 64, and 14.6% 65 or older.  The median age was 39 years. For every 100 females, there were 97.0 males.  For every 100 females age 18 and over, there were 95.1 males.

The median household income was $37,204 and the median family income  was $41,795. Males had a median income of $30,861 versus $21,936 for females. The per capita income for the CDP was $17,144.  About 6.7% of families and 11.1% of the population were below the poverty line, including 16.3% of those under age 18 and 7.3% of those age 65 or over.

Geography
Drained by the Clarendon River, West Rutland lies between the Taconic Range and the Green Mountains.

The town is crossed by U.S. Route 4, Vermont Route 3, and Vermont Route 4A.

Town center
The boundaries of the town center as defined by the U.S. Census Bureau are as follows: U.S. Route 4 and some power lines on the west; Dewey Avenue on the southwest; Ira town line on the south; the Clarendon River on the southeast; the Rutland town line on the east; the Proctor town line on the northeast and more power lines on the north and northwest.

Climate
The Köppen Climate Classification subtype for this climate is "Dfb" (Warm Summer Continental Climate).

Notable people 

 Peter J. Hincks, Vermont State Treasurer
 Harvey H. Johnson, US congressman
 James Patrick Leamy, judge
 George E. Royce, marble company executive and state Senator
 Aldace F. Walker, member of Interstate Commerce Commission and railway president

Sites of interest
 Carving Studio & Sculpture Center
 Marble Valley Players—West Rutland Town Hall Theater
West Rutland Art Park
The West Rutland Marsh is a designated Important Bird Area by the National Audubon Society and is a popular destination for birdwatching.
 West Rutland School

References

External links
 Town of West Rutland official website
 History of Rutland
 Rutland Herald story on the closing of the quarries in 1993

 
Towns in Vermont
Towns in Rutland County, Vermont